CD120 (Cluster of Differentiation 120) can refer to two members of the tumor necrosis factor receptor superfamily: tumor necrosis factor receptor 1 (TNFR1) and tumor necrosis factor receptor 2 (TNFR2).

Receptor subtypes 
There are two variants of the receptor, each encoded by a separate gene:

 CD120a - TNFR1 - TNFR superfamily member 1A
 CD120b - TNFR2 - TNFR superfamily member 1B

TNFR1 is the receptor type responsible for mediation of TNF-alpha induced sickness behavior, and is involved in neurotoxic processes. Elevated levels of TNFR1 has been found in severe mental disorders.

Signaling pathway

See also 
 Cluster of differentiation

References

External links